Andriy Pavlovych "Andrei" Mikhnov (born 26 November 1983) is a Ukrainian professional ice hockey player currently playing for Steaua Bucharest of the Romanian Hockey League (FRHG). He was drafted in the second round of the 2002 NHL Entry Draft by the St. Louis Blues. He plays center and left wing and shoots left. He is also a member of the Ukrainian national team and has played in several international tournaments, including the 2006 World Championships.

Career statistics

Regular season and playoffs

International

References
 

1983 births
Ak Bars Kazan players
Expatriate ice hockey players in Russia
GKS Tychy (ice hockey) players
HC Berkut players
HC Donbass players
HC Lada Togliatti players
HC Neftekhimik Nizhnekamsk players
Kingston Frontenacs players
Living people
Metallurg Zhlobin players
Salavat Yulaev Ufa players
Sportspeople from Kyiv
St. Louis Blues draft picks
Sudbury Wolves players
Toronto St. Michael's Majors players
Traktor Chelyabinsk players
Ukrainian expatriate sportspeople in Canada
Ukrainian ice hockey left wingers
Yunost Minsk players
Sokil Kyiv players